Mont Malamot (Italian: Monte Malamot; also called Pointe Droset in French) is a mountain   in the northern Cottian Alps, near the Mont Cenis pass.

History 
Nowadays entirely included in French territory,  it separates the valleys of Dora Riparia and Arc. At the top is a large fortification built by the Italian Regio Esercito in 1889, on two floors, which could house some 200 troops. The area was further fortified in 1932-1940 during the construction of the Alpine Wall.

Sources

Mountains of the Alps
Landforms of Savoie
Mountains of Auvergne-Rhône-Alpes